Horace Arthur Norton (15 September 1896 – March 1976) was an English professional football forward and right half who played in the Football League for Brentford and Bradford City.

Career statistics

References

English footballers
English Football League players
Brentford F.C. players
Association football forwards
Association football wing halves
Bradford City A.F.C. players
People from Cleckheaton
Darlington F.C. players
1896 births
1976 deaths